Jacob Tsimerman (born 1988) is a Canadian mathematician at the University of Toronto specialising in number theory and related areas. He was awarded the SASTRA Ramanujan Prize in the year 2015 in recognition for his work on the André–Oort conjecture and for his work in both analytic number theory and algebraic geometry.

Education 
He studied at the University of Toronto, graduating in 2006 with a bachelor's degree in math. He obtained his PhD from Princeton in 2011 under the guidance of Peter Sarnak.

Career
Jacob Tsimerman was born in Kazan, Russia, on April 26, 1988. In 1990 his family first moved to Israel and then in 1996 to Canada.  In  2003 and 2004 he represented Canada in the International Mathematical Olympiad (IMO) and won gold medals both years, with a perfect score in 2004.

Following his PhD, he had a post-doctoral position at Harvard University as a Junior Fellow of the Harvard Society of Fellows. In July 2014 he was awarded a Sloan Fellowship and he started his term as assistant professor at the University of Toronto, where he is now a full professor.  

Tsimerman has worked at Radix Trading LLC developing quantitative trading models.

Research
Together with Jonathan Pila, Tsimerman demonstrated the André–Oort conjecture for Siegel modular varieties.  Later, he completed the proof of the full André-Oort conjecture for all moduli spaces of abelian varieties by reducing the problem to the averaged Colmez conjecture which was proved by Xinyi Yuan and Shou-Wu Zhang as well as independently by Andreatta, Goren, Howard and Madapusi-Pera.

References

1988 births
Living people
Number theorists
Recipients of the SASTRA Ramanujan Prize
Jewish Canadian scientists
Canadian mathematicians
Canadian people of Russian-Jewish descent
Israeli emigrants to Canada
Princeton University alumni
Soviet emigrants to Israel
Academic staff of the University of Toronto
Russian Jews